Nathan W. Pease (1836–1918) was an American photographer in North Conway, New Hampshire, United States.

Works

He produced many dozens of stereoscopic images with scenes from his home state. He also produced one of a full moon. In 1870 he published a series documenting the landscape of the White Mountains of New Hampshire.

He was one of many photographers to work in the area of Glen House and Mount Washington.

The White Mountain School of painters were also active in the area.

References

Commercial photographers
1836 births
1918 deaths
Artists from New Hampshire
Stereoscopic photography
White Mountains (New Hampshire)
19th-century American photographers
People from North Conway, New Hampshire